Beavers Bend State Park is a  Oklahoma state park located in McCurtain County. It was established in 1937 and contains Broken Bow Lake.

National Public Radio reported that the park generated $1,787,731 in 2011, excluding $414,255 in revenue from Lakeview Lodge. Thus, gross earnings were around $2.3 million. The report did not list the number of visitors, but stated that this had the second highest attendance of any Oklahoma state park during the year.

This is 1 of 7 state parks in Oklahoma that will be in the path of totality for the April 8th, 2024 total solar eclipse, with 4 minutes and 15.2 seconds of totality.

History
Construction on the park began in 1935, and it was named after John T. Beavers, a Choctaw settler who originally owned some of the land. Other portions of the park were purchased from the Choctaw Lumber Company. The Civilian Conservation Corps contributed significantly to the park's construction, and it received over 2,000 visitors in its first year of operation despite not being fully developed.  

This park absorbed the former Hochatown State Park in 2017.

Attractions

Beavers Bend State Park offers a variety of individual and group activities. Eagle watches are available from November through February. Trout fishing, fly fishing clinics, guided horseback rides, and hayrides throughout the park are other activities offered at Beavers Bend.

A year-round naturalist and a well-stocked nature center make possible a program lineup that includes campfire programs on the banks of the Mountain Fork River, nature hikes, arts and crafts classes, water sports, bingo, sunset hikes, nature films, and astronomy outings. 14,000 acre (57 km2) Broken Bow Lake is also a favorite of scuba divers. Other park diversions include golfing, miniature golf, archery, tennis, jet skiing, bumper boat rides, boating, and canoeing.

The David L. Boren Trail offers 16 miles (26 km) of hiking trails with 4 miles (6 km) of multi-purpose trails that wander along ridge tops, over creek bottoms, through tall stands of timber, and into areas so remote one can almost experience what early-day explorers must have felt upon seeing the Ouachita National Forest for the first time. The same trail can also be divided into a variety of short and long hikes for those not wishing to make the entire trek.

Forest Heritage Center
Visitors to the Forest Heritage Center's museum will find historical documents, antique forestry tools, wood art, homestead memorabilia, and a research library filled with books, periodicals, and other materials pertaining to forestry, the primary industry of the area.

The Center is also home to 14 dioramas (painted by Harry Rossoll of Atlanta, Georgia, the artist who created Smokey Bear) that cover prehistoric forests, Caddo Indians, Papermaking in the South, 1940s lumbering, and forest appreciation. Each diorama is accompanied by a taped narration.  In June 2003 an eight-foot-tall bronze sculpture was unveiled, honoring the memory of Jim Burnett and all people who risk their lives fighting wildland fires each year. Burnett was the first forest firefighter from Oklahoma to lose his life in the line of duty and one of the many firefighters dispatched by the state of Oklahoma to battle an outbreak of wildfires in Wyoming during the summer of 2000. Burnett lost his life on August 11, 2000 fighting the Kate's Basin Fire near Thermopolis, Wyoming.

The forest industry is the area's largest business concern, and great care is taken to ensure the prolonged health of local pine and hardwood forests.

Geology

Built on the site of an old Choctaw settlement, Beavers Bend State Park was named after John T. Beavers, a Choctaw intermarried citizen. The "bend" in the park's name refers to an area of the park where a portion of Mountain Fork River meanders sharply, making an almost 180-degree turn. This area is commonly known as the River Bend, and is a popular area for trout fishing, canoe rentals, and swimming. Also in the River Bend area is the Broken Bow Hydroelectric Plant, which generates energy from the waters of Broken Bow Lake.

The local rock formations are some of the most distinctive in the state of Oklahoma. Just north of Broken Bow, sedimentary rock has been thrust upward due to an ancient collision of the North American and South American Plates, forming what is now the Ouachita Mountains. Evidence of what is called the Ouachita orogeny can be seen all over the park, where some layers of rock can be seen tilted up at angles of about sixty-degrees. These geologic features can be easily viewed around Broken Bow Lake and Mountain Fork River, where erosion has left much of the rock exposed. The unique geology of the area inspires frequent field trips by geology students from numerous colleges and universities.

Fees
To help fund a backlog of deferred maintenance and park improvements, the state implemented an entrance fee for this park and 21 others effective June 15, 2020.  The fees, charged per vehicle, start at $10 per day for a single-day or $8 for residents with an Oklahoma license plate or Oklahoma tribal plate.  Fees are waived for honorably discharged veterans and Oklahoma residents age 62 & older and their spouses.  Passes good for three days or a week are also available; annual passes good at all 22 state parks charging fees are offered at a cost of $75 for out-of-state visitors or $60 for Oklahoma residents.  The 22 parks are:
  Arrowhead Area at Lake Eufaula State Park
 Beavers Bend State Park
 Boiling Springs State Park
 Cherokee Landing State Park
 Fort Cobb State Park
 Foss State Park
  Honey Creek Area at Grand Lake State Park
 Great Plains State Park
 Great Salt Plains State Park
 Greenleaf State Park
 Keystone State Park
 Lake Eufaula State Park
 Lake Murray State Park
 Lake Texoma State Park
 Lake Thunderbird State Park
 Lake Wister State Park
 Natural Falls State Park
 Osage Hills State Park
 Robbers Cave State Park
 Sequoyah State Park
 Tenkiller State Park
  Twin Bridges Area at Grand Lake State Park

References

External links
 Beavers Bend State Park - Video footage of the area and a list of local activities and resources.
 Aerial View of Broken Bow Lake - Video footage of the area and a list of local activities and resources.
Forest Heritage Center info and photos on TravelOK.com - Official travel and tourism website for the State of Oklahoma
Beavers Bend State Park
Broken Bow Lake
Beavers Bend Fly Shop
Beaver's Bend Fly Fishing Site
Beavers Bend Lodging - Luxury Rental Cabins
Beavers Bend Lodging - Rustic Luxury Cabins
Beavers Bend State Park and Broken Bow Lake - Recreational and lodging information guide, including information on fishing, hiking and water sports.
Vacation Broken Bow Lake - Local area guide for Broken Bow and Beavers Bend, including area maps, hiking trails and restaurants.

External links
 

State parks of Oklahoma
State parks of the U.S. Interior Highlands
Forestry museums in the United States
Natural history museums in Oklahoma
Museums in McCurtain County, Oklahoma
Protected areas of McCurtain County, Oklahoma
Ouachita National Forest
Nature centers in Oklahoma
Protected areas established in 1937
1937 establishments in Oklahoma